Zygoballus electus is a species of jumping spider which occurs in Panama. It was first described by the arachnologist Arthur M. Chickering in 1946. The type specimens are housed at the Museum of Comparative Zoology in the United States.

The species has been collected from several areas of Panama including El Valle de Antón, Portobelo, and Barro Colorado Island (Canal Zone Biological Area).

References

External links

Zygoballus electus at Worldwide database of jumping spiders
Zygoballus electus at Salticidae: Diagnostic Drawings Library

Salticidae
Spiders of Central America
Spiders described in 1946